Scrobipalpa manchurica is a moth in the family Gelechiidae. It was described by Shōnen Matsumura in 1931. It is found in Manchuria.

References

Scrobipalpa
Moths described in 1931